John Gregson (born 17 May 1939) is an English former professional footballer who played as a winger for several clubs in the Football League. Having to retire through injury, a testimonial match was played between a Cambridge 11 and a full strength Ipswich Town, managed by the late Sir Bobby Robson.

References
John Gregson career statistics at the Post-War Players Database

1939 births
Living people
People from Skelmersdale
English footballers
Association football midfielders
Skelmersdale United F.C. players
Blackpool F.C. players
Chester City F.C. players
Shrewsbury Town F.C. players
Mansfield Town F.C. players
Lincoln City F.C. players
Cambridge United F.C. players
English Football League players